Borba blanca is a white Spanish wine grape variety grown primarily in the Extremadura region of south central Spain. According to wine expert Jancis Robinson, the grape is of average to low quality and notable mostly for the high productivity and yields of the vine.

References

Spanish wine
Grape varieties of Spain
White wine grape varieties